The Federated States of Micronesia, a country in Oceania consisting of around 607 islands, observes two time zones, UTC+10:00 in its western part, and UTC+11:00 in its eastern part. Micronesia does not have an associated daylight saving time.

Micronesia lies just north of the equator, west of the international date line.

IANA time zone database 
In the IANA time zone database, Micronesia is given the following three time zones:

References 

Time in the Federated States of Micronesia